Lærke Nolsøe Pedersen (born 19 February 1996) is a Danish handball player for Viborg HK and the Danish national team.

She represented Denmark at the 2019 World Women's Handball Championship in Japan.

International honours
EHF Cup Winners' Cup:
Winner: 2016
EHF Cup:
Winner: 2015

Individual awards  
 All-Star Left Wing of the IHF Junior World Championship: 2016
All-Star Left Wing of the Danish League: 2018/19, 2020/2021

References

External links

1996 births
Living people
Sportspeople from Aalborg
Danish female handball players
TTH Holstebro players
Nykøbing Falster Håndboldklub players